Nobody's Business may refer to:

Books
"Nobody's Business" (comic) 1987 Disney Donald Duck comic
"Nobody's Business", prize-winning short story from collection Unaccustomed Earth by Jhumpa Lahiri
Act 1 – Morning – "Nobody's business" from Sweet Lavender play in three acts by Arthur Wing Pinero, first performed in 1888.

Film and TV
Nobody's Business (film), a 1926 film by Norman Taurog with Lloyd Hamilton, Dick Sutherland, James T. Kelley
Nobody's Business, film by Alan Berliner
"Nobody's Business", Season 2 Episode 3 of The Manipulators (1971)

Music
Nobody's Business (album), Japan market only album by Bobby Harrison and friends 1977
"Nobody's Business" (song), 2012 by Rihanna and Chris Brown
"Nobody's Business", song by the Country Gentlemen from Bluegrass at Carnegie Hall 1962
"Nobody's Business", song by John Fahey, from Your Past Comes Back To Haunt You: The Fonotone Years 1958–1965
"Nobody's Business", song by Lou Reed from Coney Island Baby 1976
"Nobody's Business", song by Peter Hammill from Nadir's Big Chance 1975
"Nobody's Business", song by guitarist Norman Blake from Nashville Blues (album) 1984 and Slow Train Through Georgia
"Nobody's Business", song by H2O (Scottish band) featuring Billie from Shakedown (band) which entered the UK top 20 chart
"Nobody's Business", song by Myra Flynn featuring Rayvon 2015
Nobody's Business, a band led by Bobby Harrison 1977
Josh Logan & Nobody's Business, a band fronted by Josh Logan (rock singer)

See also
"Ain't Nobody's Business", classic blues song - signature tune of Jimmy Witherspoon